Mount Hope is the name of places in the U.S. state of Alabama:

Mount Hope, Lawrence County, Alabama
Mount Hope, Walker County, Alabama